Claire Lois Whitaker  was the director of the music production company Serious.

Whitaker was the bid director for the Southampton City of Culture for 2025. She is currently Chair of the Royal Commonwealth Society and  a trustee of the Paul Hamlyn Foundation. She was appointed Officer of the Order of the British Empire (OBE) in the 2015 Birthday Honours for services to jazz. In July 2020 she was announced as one of the independent member of the Culture Recovery Board, which administers the Culture Recovery Fund as part of the UK response to the COVID-19 pandemic in England.

Whitaker was appointed Commander of the Order of the British Empire (CBE) in the 2023 New Year Honours for services to the arts and culture.

References

Living people
Year of birth missing (living people)
Commanders of the Order of the British Empire
Trustees of charities